Strzegowo  (German Stregow) is a village in the administrative district of Gmina Wolin, within Kamień County, West Pomeranian Voivodeship, in north-western Poland.

References

Strzegowo